Adrián Alonso Pereira (born 26 June 1988), commonly known as Pola, is a Spanish futsal player who plays for Inter Movistar as an Ala.

Honours
Inter FS
6 Primera Division (2014, 2015, 2016, 2017, 2018, 2020)
4 Copa de España (2014, 2016, 2017, 2021)
2 Copa del Rey (2015, 2021)
6 Supercopa de España (2011, 2015, 2017, 2018, 2020)
2 UEFA Futsal Champions League (2017, 2018)

Santiago Futsal
1 Copa de España (2005/06)
1 Supercopa de España (2010)
1 Campeonato de Europa sub-21 (2007)
3 Copas Xunta de Galicia (2009, 2010)

Spain
 Campeón Europa sub-21 2007/2008
1 UEFA Futsal Championship (2016)

References

External links
lnfs.es profile
RFEF profile
UEFA profile

1988 births
Living people
Spanish men's futsal players
Santiago Futsal players
Inter FS players
Sportspeople from Vigo